Vidiots is an independent video rental store in Los Angeles, California.

History 
 
Vidiots was founded by Cathy Tauber and Patricia Polinger in 1985. The original Vidiots location was based in Santa Monica and featured a library consisting of 800 titles.

Throughout the 90s and early 2000s, Vidiots distinguished themselves from larger video rental store chains, such as Blockbuster, by featuring obscure and niche titles, including several VHS that were never made into DVDs, and movies which were out of print entirely.
 
While experiencing a steady increase in cinephile customers, Vidiots expanded their programming to include a series of film-related events, including screenings, small festivals for local filmmakers, speaker spotlights, etc. Vidiots' video library increased to 50,000 titles by the 2010s.

At the encouragement and assistance of filmmaker David O. Russell, Vidiots became a non-profit organization in 2012, Vidiots Foundation. Their stated mission was to "preserve, protect and educate," about the history of film and the various kinds of filmmaking.

In 2016, Vidiots recognized Harry Dean Stanton with their inaugural Harry Dean Stanton Award. The award recognizes a member of the film community whose body of work has helped define or impact American cinema.

In 2017, Vidiots closed after struggling to maintain itself with the increase in streaming platforms and viewership.

Re-opening 
 
During its interim years without a physical location, the Vidiots Foundation partnered with other existing independent theaters to maintain its organization. The foundation collaborated on programming with Bootleg Theater, Alamo Drafthouse, UCLA Film & Television Archive, Rooftop Cinema Club and the Theatre at the Ace Hotel.

In 2020, Vidiots began a fundraising campaign to raise money for its storefront reopening.

In 2021, Play-PerView staged a presentation of Bill Corbett's play, The Medievalists, starring Jason Ritter, Paget Brewster, James Urbaniak, and Rea Seehorn, proceeds for which went to Vidiots. The Vidiots foundation received the 2021-2022 Hollywood Foreign Press Association Grant for promoting "cultural exchange through film." The foundation also received a National Association of Theatre Owners grant in 2022 and partnered with A24 in auctions, benefits for which went to the Vidiots' campaign.

Vidiots re-opened its doors in 2022 at a new location, the former Eagle Theater in Eagle Rock, Los Angeles.  Vidiots resumed its full program of screenings of repertory titles and cult favorites. The Vidiots storefront operates in the space, where the original collection of rental videos is maintained.

References 

Video rental services